Uptake may refer to:

Uptake (business), a predictive analytics company based in Chicago, Illinois
The UpTake, a Minnesota-based citizen journalist organization
Diffusion (business), the acceptance or adoption of a new product or idea
Absorption, especially of food or nutrient by an organism. (see digestion)
Mineral uptake, by plants
 Neurotransmitter uptake carriers, a class of membrane transport proteins that pump neurotransmitters from the extracellular space into the cell